Wolf 1061c is an exoplanet orbiting within the habitable zone of the red dwarf star Wolf 1061 in the constellation Ophiuchus, about 13.8 light years from Earth, making it the fifth closest known, potentially habitable, and confirmed exoplanet to Earth (after Proxima Centauri b, Ross 128 b, Luyten b and Tau Ceti e), yielding interest from astronomers. It is the second planet in order from its host star in a triple planetary system, and has an orbital period of 17.9 days. Wolf 1061c is classified as a super-Earth exoplanet as its estimated radius is greater than 1.5 .

Characteristics

Mass, radius and temperature
Wolf 1061c is thought to be a rocky planet estimated to be a super-Earth exoplanet as its mass is about 4.3 times that of Earth and radius is over 1.5 which would give it a density either near or possibly higher than Earth. It has an estimated surface gravity of 1.6 times that on Earth.

In astronomical terms, the Wolf 1061 system is relatively close to Earth, at only 13.8 light years away.

The discovery was announced on 17 December 2015, following a study that used 10 years of archival spectra of the star Wolf 1061 using the HARPS spectrograph attached to the ESO 3.6 m Telescope at the European Southern Observatory at La Silla, Chile.

Host star
The planet orbits a (M-type) star named Wolf 1061, orbited by a total of three planets. The star has a mass of 0.25  and a radius of 0.26 . It has a temperature of 3380 K. The age is poorly constrained/unknown, but estimates would place it around a few billion years. In comparison, the Sun is 4.6 billion years old and has a surface temperature of 5778 K.

The star's apparent magnitude, or how bright it appears from Earth's perspective, is 10.1. Therefore, it is too dim to be seen with the naked eye.

Orbit
Wolf 1061c orbits its host star with less than 1% of the Sun's luminosity every 17.9 days at a distance of 0.08 AU (compared to Mercury which orbits at a distance of 0.38 AU).

Habitability
The planet's orbital distance of 0.084 AU (assuming mild eccentricity) lies at the inner edge of its star's habitable zone, which extends from approximately 0.073 to 0.190 AU (for comparison, the habitable zone of the Sun is approximated at 0.5 to 3.0 AU for its different energy emission). Its host star is a red dwarf, with about a quarter as much mass as the Sun. As a result, stars like Wolf 1061 have the ability to burn up to 400–500 billion years, 40–50 times longer than the Sun will.

Because it is so close to the star, it is likely to be tidally locked, meaning one side permanently faces the star and the other side permanently faces away. Although this scenario could result in extreme temperature differences on the planet, the terminator line that separates the illuminated side and the dark side could potentially be habitable, as the temperature there could be suitable for liquid water to exist. Additionally, a much larger portion of the planet could also be habitable if it has a thick enough atmosphere to facilitate heat transfer away from the side facing the star.

See also
 List of exoplanets
 List of potentially habitable exoplanets

References

External links

Simulated view of the Wolf 1061 system. Video created by the University of New South Wales

Wolf 1061
Exoplanets in the habitable zone
Exoplanets discovered in 2015
Super-Earths in the habitable zone
Ophiuchus (constellation)
Exoplanets detected by radial velocity